Angelo Rossi (died 1568) was a Roman Catholic prelate who served as Bishop of Alife (1567–1568).

Biography
On 31 January 1567, Angelo Rossi was appointed during the papacy of Pope Pius V as Bishop of Alife.
He served as Bishop of Alife until his death in 1568.

References

External links and additional sources
 (for Chronology of Bishops) 
 (for Chronology of Bishops) 

16th-century Italian Roman Catholic bishops
Bishops appointed by Pope Pius V
1568 deaths